Alfred Blumstein (born 1930) is an American scientist and the J. Erik Jonsson University Professor of Urban Systems and Operations Research at the Heinz College and Department of Engineering and Public Policy at Carnegie Mellon University. He is known as one of the top researchers in criminology and operations research.

In 1998, Blumstein was elected a member of the National Academy of Engineering for bringing systems engineering and operations research to the field of criminology.

Biography 
Blumstein graduated with his bachelor's degree and Ph.D. from Cornell University and worked at the Institute for Defense Analyses before joining the Heinz College.

Blumstein directs the NSF-funded National Consortium on Violence Research at Carnegie Mellon and was dean of the Heinz College from 1986 to 1993

He is a fellow of the American Association for the Advancement of Science (AAAS) and the American Society of Criminology and serves as President of the latter.

Blumstein was president of the Operations Research Society of America (ORSA) in 1977–1978, The Institute of Management Sciences (TIMS) in 1987-88 and in 1996 he was the president of the Institute for Operations Research and the Management Sciences (INFORMS). He became an INFORMS Fellow in 2002.
 
He was awarded the Wolfgang Award for Distinguished Achievement in Criminology in 1998 and was elected a member of the National Academy of Engineering in 1998.  He also shares the 2007 Stockholm Prize in Criminology, the highest award in the field—he and his co-recipient are the first two Americans to earn the prize.  In 1996, he was awarded an honorary Doctor of Laws degree by the John Jay College of Criminal Justice of the City University of New York.

He is married and has three daughters and four grandchildren.

Work 
Blumstein's research centers around modeling criminal careers, deterrence, prison population, transportation analysis, drug-enforcement policy, and he developed "lambda" in criminology as a measurement of an individual's offending frequency.

Publications 
 1968. National program of research, development, test, and evaluation on law enforcement and criminal justice.
 1970. Systems analysis for social problems. Edited with Murray Kamrass and Armand B. Weiss.
 1978. Assembly of Behavioral and Social Sciences (U.S.). Panel on Research on Deterrent and Incapacitative Effects. Deterrence and incapacitation: estimating the effects of criminal sanctions on crime rates. Edited with Jacqueline Cohen and Daniel Nagin. 
 1983. Research on sentencing: the search for reform. Edited with others.
 1986. Criminal careers and "career criminals". Edited with others.
 2000. Crime drop in America. Edited with Joel Wallman.
 2007. Key issues in criminal career research: new analyses of the Cambridge Study in Delinquent Development. With Alex R. Piquero and David P. Farrington.

References

External links 
Alfred Blumstein Stockholm Prize bio
Alred Blumstein's Heinz College bio
US Department of Justice article on Alfred Blumstein's contributions to criminology
Biography of Alfred Blumstein from the Institute for Operations Research and the Management Sciences

Carnegie Mellon University faculty
Cornell University alumni
American criminologists
American operations researchers
Living people
American systems scientists
1930 births
Members of the United States National Academy of Engineering
Winners of the Stockholm Prize in Criminology
Fellows of the Institute for Operations Research and the Management Sciences